Kinda Folksy is the debut album by vocal-trio The Springfields. It was directed by Ivor Raymonde.

Track listing
"Wimoweh Mambo" (Paul Campbell, Solomon Linda) - 1:55
"The Black Hills of Dakota" (Paul Francis Webster, Sammy Fain) - 2:25
"Row, Row, Row" (James V. Monaco, William Jerome) - 2:10
"The Green Leaves of Summer" (Dimitri Tiomkin, Paul Francis Webster) - 2:15
"Silver Dollar" (Clarke Van Ness, Jack Palmer) - 2:08
"Allentown Jail" (Irving Gordon) - 2:35
"Lonesome Traveller" (Traditional; arranged by Lee Hays) - 1:40
"Dear Hearts And Gentle People" (Bob Hilliard, Sammy Fain) - 3:00
"They Took John Away" (Bobby Sharp) - 2:15
"Eso Es El Amor" (Pepe Iglesias; English lyrics: Sunny Skylar) - 2:05
"Two Brothers" (Irving Gordon) - 2:35
"Tzena, Tzena, Tzena" (Issachar Miron, Julius Grossman, Mitchell Parish) - 2:14

Personnel
The Springfields
Dusty Springfield - vocals
Tom Springfield - guitar, vocals
Mike Hurst - guitar, vocals
with:
Ivor Raymonde - accompaniment director 

1962 debut albums
The Springfields albums
albums produced by Johnny Franz
Philips Records albums